In 2017, Hasbro Studios released two series of animated shorts that are tied in with My Little Pony: Equestria Girls, an anthropomorphic spin-off franchise of the 2010 relaunch of Hasbro's My Little Pony toyline. One, titled Canterlot Shorts, was produced by Boulder Media in the Republic of Ireland and the other, a series of music videos, was produced by DHX Media in Canada. Discovery Family bills the two series together as Summertime Shorts.

Voice Cast

Tara Strong as Twilight Sparkle
Ashleigh Ball as Applejack & Rainbow Dash
Andrea Libman as Fluttershy & Pinkie Pie
Tabitha St. Germain as Rarity, Photo Finish & Granny Smith
Rebecca Shoichet as Sunset Shimmer
Michelle Creber as Apple Bloom
 Madeleine Peters as Scootaloo
Nicole Oliver as Principal Celestia
Claire Corlett as Sweetie Belle

Shorts

Canterlot Shorts
Although the title card for this series has nothing but an Equestria Girls logo, the shorts are referred by Hasbro as Canterlot Shorts. The shorts were all written by Gillian M. Berrow (who also wrote the novelization of first Equestria Girls film as well as most of the Friendship Is Magic novels) and were produced by Boulder Media in the Republic of Ireland (which Hasbro Studios acquired in 2016).

Music videos
A series of music videos were produced by DHX Media's 2D animation studio located in Vancouver, Canada, which have produced the Equestria Girls animated films and specials.

Release
In the United States, the shorts were shown on Discovery Family (a joint venture between Discovery Communications and Hasbro) as part of Discovery Family's "Summer Splash" seasonal event where they are collectively known as Summertime Shorts. Internationally, Hasbro has been releasing each short every Friday since August 11, 2017 via their official YouTube channel, starting with "Mad Twience" and ending with "Epic Fails" on November 10.

Notes

References

My Little Pony: Equestria Girls
My Little Pony television series
2010s American animated television series
2010s Canadian animated television series
2017 American television series debuts
2017 Canadian television series debuts
2017 American television series endings
2017 Canadian television series endings
American children's animated fantasy television series
American flash animated television series
Canadian children's animated fantasy television series
Canadian flash animated television series
Television series by Hasbro Studios
Television series by DHX Media
Discovery Family original programming
Animated music videos